Pakenham is a village and civil parish in the West Suffolk district of Suffolk in eastern England. Its name can be linked to Anglo-Saxon roots, Pacca being the founder of a settlement on the hill surrounding Pakenham church. The village describes itself as the "Village of Two Mills", as it has a water mill which claims to be the only working example in the county. The Pakenham windmill no longer works. 

The village sits to the east of Bury St. Edmunds and is administered as part of the borough of St Edmundsbury. Prior to the local government reorganisation of 1974 it was part of Thingoe Rural District.

History
Pacca was the founder of a settlement on the hill where Pakenham church now sits, on an area higher than the waters of Pakenham Fen. The discovery of many Anglo-Saxon remains, notably that of a bone-toothed comb in the old school garden (near the church) in the 1950s, testify to the authenticity of the site. The village was therefore named Pacca's Ham, i.e. the home of Pacca. 

This name eventually became Pakenham, (pronounced locally with a long "a" sound.) The Anglo-Saxon family name later became "de Pakenham". Pacca's descendants continued to farm here until the Norman Conquest of 1066.

The village has contained several manor houses, such as Pakenham Hall the family seat of the Spring family, but has now been demolished. Nether Hall was the original home of the de Pakenham family, and later seat of the Greene baronets. Newe House was built by Sir Robert Bright before becoming the dower house of the Spring family. Several members of the Spring family are buried in the parish church.

Notable residents
Hamon L'Estrange (1605 – 1660), writer on history, theology and liturgy who is buried at Pakenham. 
Joanne Jennings (1969- ), high jumper who competed for Great Britain twice at the Summer Olympics and won silver at the 1998 Commonwealth Games.
Thomas Thornhill (1837-1900), baronet, High Sheriff of Suffolk in 1860, Conservative politician, and Member of Parliament (MP) for the Western division of Suffolk at a by-election in October 1875, and held the seat until the constituency was abolished at the 1885 general election.

Gallery

See also
Pakenham Windmill

References

External links 

Village website
Village Hall website
Water mill website
Village website

Villages in Suffolk
Civil parishes in Suffolk
Borough of St Edmundsbury
Thedwastre Hundred